The 1924 Kilkenny Senior Hurling Championship was the 30th staging of the Kilkenny Senior Hurling Championship since its establishment by the Kilkenny County Board.

On 22 March 1925, Tullaroan won the championship after a 4-04 to 2-02 defeat of Clonmanto in the final. It was their 13th championship title overall and their first title since 1915.

Results

Final

References

Kilkenny Senior Hurling Championship
Kilkenny Senior Hurling Championship